Ronald Joseph Chepesiuk (born June 14, 1944) is a former academic and full university professor. He is currently an author, publisher, radio host, film producer and screenwriter.

Documentary producer, writer and director 
The Frank Matthews Story (2012) 
Ike Atkinson, Kingpin. In his Own Words (2012)
Superfly: The True Untold Story of Frank Lucas, American Gangster (2007)

Books 

Gangsters of Harlem (2007)
Superfly: The True, Untold Story of Frank Lucas, American Gangster (2008)
Sergeant Smack (2010) 
The Trafficantes (2010)
Queenpins (2011) 
Straight from the Hood (2011)
Gangsters of Miami (2013)
Escobar versus Cali: The War of the Cartels (2013)
Black Caesar (2013) 
Black Gangsters of Chicago (2014)
Shrimp Boy: The Life and Times of Raymond Chow, Chinatown Gangster (2016)
Crazy Charlie: Carlos Lehder, Revolutionary or Neo Nazi (2016)
Narcos Inc. (2019)
Robin Hood of the Hood: The Life and Times of Teddy Roe, Police King (2019)
The Real Mr. Big: How a Colombian Refugee Became the United Kingdom’s Most Notorious Cocaine Kingpin (2021)

Honors 
In 1999, Chepesiuk received the Humphrey/OCLC/ Forest Press Award for significant contribution to international librarianship.
In the 1990s, Chepesiuk served as a contributing editor of American Libraries, the official publication of the American Library Association.
In 2002, he served as a Fulbright Scholar and visiting professor of journalism at Chittagong University in Bangladesh. 
2008 Independent Publisher Book Award
From 2009 to 2010, he served as a Fulbright Scholar and Visiting Professor at Paramadina University in Jakarta, Indonesia. He currently serves as a Senior Research Associate at the Policy Institute at Paramadina University.
2011 Independent Publisher Book Awards

References

External links
 
 The Crime Beat with Ron Chepesiuk

Winthrop University faculty
1944 births
Living people
Place of birth missing (living people)
Canadian academics
21st-century Canadian non-fiction writers
Canadian documentary film producers
21st-century Canadian screenwriters
Canadian male screenwriters
Canadian documentary film directors